Alberto Pomini (born 17 March 1981) is an Italian footballer who plays as a goalkeeper for SPAL.

Career

Early career
Born in Isola della Scala, Veneto, Pomini started his professional career at Verona. After graduating from Primavera under-20 reserve team in 2001, Pomini left for San Marino Calcio in co-ownership deal. In the first season he was the understudy of Fabio Fabbri. Pomini played half of the game of 2002–03 Serie C2. He shared the starting role with Giovanni Vecchini. In June 2003 Verona gave up the remain 50% registration rights to San Marino Calcio.

In mid-2003, he left for Serie C2 newcomer Bellaria – Igea Marina. Pomini played 20 games in 2003–04 Serie C2, ahead promotion protagonist Filippo Spitoni. Pomini also suspended 2 games due to send off.

Sassuolo
In mid-2004, Pomini was signed by fellow Serie C2 club Sassuolo. He was the longest serving player of the team as of 2015–16 Serie A season. Along with Nicolò Consolini, Gaetano Masucci and Marco Piccioni, they were the backbone of the squad to promote to Serie B in 2008. In the first season, Pomini shared the starting role with Gabriele Giaroli. Pomini played in the return leg of the promotion playoffs only. In the second season, Giaroli became the backup and Pomini played all four games in the promotion playoffs, which Sassuolo was the winner. In his maiden Serie C1 season, Romini was the understudy of Michael Agazzi. After Agazzi left the club in 2007, the club signed Massimiliano Benassi as first choice. The club promoted in 2007–08 Serie C1 as the grand champion.

Pomini only played once in his first Serie B season. In 2008–09 Serie B Pomini was the backup of Walter Bressan, along with Andrea Pinzan (since January 2009). Pomini was the understudy until 2010–11 Serie B, which Pomini played 23 games. Pomini also played in the playoffs round of 2009–10 Serie B, losing to Torino. In 2011–12 Serie B, Sassuolo signed former youth internationals Davide Bassi, however Pomini was able to become the first choice.

Pomini wore no.17 shirt from 2008 to 2012. In 2012, he received number 1 shirt from departing Davide Bassi.

In June 2015 he signed a new 1-year contract with Sassuolo. In May 2016 he signed a new 1-year contract again.

Palermo
In the summer of 2017, he signed for Serie B club Palermo. After starting the season behind Josip Posavec, he became the first choice by the end of the season.

He was confirmed as a reserve keeper for the club's 2018–19 campaign, with Posavec out on loan to Hajduk Split and Alberto Brignoli in as a replacement.

Venezia
On 17 July 2019, he signed a two-year contract with Venezia.

SPAL
On 27 August 2021, he joined SPAL in Serie B on a one-year contract.

Honours
 Supercoppa di Lega di Prima Divisione: 2008 (Sassuolo)
 Lega Pro Prima Divisione: 2008 (Sassuolo)

References

External links
 Lega Serie B profile 

1981 births
Sportspeople from the Province of Verona
Footballers from Veneto
Living people
Italian footballers
Association football goalkeepers
Hellas Verona F.C. players
A.S.D. Victor San Marino players
A.C. Bellaria Igea Marina players
U.S. Sassuolo Calcio players
Palermo F.C. players
Venezia F.C. players
S.P.A.L. players
Serie A players
Serie B players
Serie C players